The following elections occurred in the year 1870.

North America

Canada
 1870 Manitoba general election
 1870 New Brunswick general election

United States
 United States House of Representatives elections in California, 1870
 1870 New York special judicial election
 1870 New York state election
 United States House of Representatives elections in South Carolina, 1870
 1870 South Carolina gubernatorial election
 1870 and 1871 United States House of Representatives elections
 1870 and 1871 United States Senate elections

Europe
 1870 Dalmatian parliamentary election

See also
 :Category:1870 elections

1870
Elections